Battle of Kolberg or Colberg may refer to
Battle of Colberger Heide (1644), during the Danish-Swedish War, a theater of the Thirty Years' War
Siege of Kolberg (Seven Years' War), three subsequent sieges in 1759, 1760 and 1761
Siege of Kolberg (1807), during the Napoleonic Wars
Battle of Kolberg (1945), during World War II